Mabini Bridge, formerly and still referred as Nagtahan Bridge, is a road bridge crossing the Pasig River between Nagtahan Street in Santa Mesa and Quirino Avenue in Paco to the west and Pandacan to the east. It was constructed between January to February in 1945. It initially served as a pontoon bridge transporting U.S. Army jeeps and evacuate citizens caught in the crossfire during the Liberation of Manila.

History
There were plans for a new bridge to connect the Mendiola route to Malacañang Palace was made even before the emergence of World War II. However, the construction did not push through. The pontoon bridge stood for several decades after the World War II despite the construction materials used to build it. It was made out of inflated rubber rafts placed side by side - spanning until the opposite bank of the Pasig River. It was built by the US Army Corps of Engineers - enough to carry human traffic as well as light vehicles. On August 17, 1960, a barge collided against the wooden piles of the bridge. It caused major damages to the bridge, which caused flooding within the nearby residences.

In 1963, a permanent bridge was constructed, named Nagtahan. It connected Paco with Pandacan. However, the Mabini Shrine, the former residence of Apolinario Mabini, was situated on the north bank. The government, then, relocated the house at the Polytechnic University of the Philippines in Santa Mesa. In lieu with the 103rd birth anniversary of Apolinario Mabini on July 22, 1967, President Ferdinand Marcos issued the Proclamation No. 234, s. 1967, renaming Nagtahan Bridge as the Mabini Bridge, in memory of Apolinario Mabini, the Sublime Paralytic.

In 2014, the Presidential Communications Development and Strategic Planning Office (PCDSPO) recommended changes, of the existing road signs to read Mabini Bridge, to the Department of Public Works and Highways – as a fitting contribution to the Mabini Sesquicentennial.

Present condition
Of the 13 bridges that crosses the Pasig River as of that time, only the Mabini Bridge did not undergo major face-lifting procedures during 1998. Its huge brass profiles on the sides that illuminates at varying hues were the distinctive features of the Mabini Bridge.

Marker from the National Historical Commission 
The marker of Mabini Bridge was installed on July 22, 1967 on the occasion of the 103rd Birthday Anniversary of Apolinario Mabini. It was located along Nagtahan Boulevard - connecting Santa Mesa, Manila and Paco, Manila.

See also
 List of crossings of the Pasig River

References

Bridges in Manila
Cultural Properties of the Philippines in Metro Manila
Buildings and structures in Paco, Manila
Buildings and structures in Santa Mesa
Bridges completed in 1945
Bridges completed in 1963